Río Cubuy is the name of several rivers in Puerto Rico:

 Río Cubuy (Loiza, Puerto Rico)
 Río Cubuy (Naguabo, Puerto Rico)